Irshava is a town located in Zakarpattia Oblast (province) in western Ukraine. It was the administrative center of Irshava Raion (district) until it was abolished in 2020 and was merged with Khust Raion.

Names

History 

The Hasidic Rabbi Joel Teitelbaum (later of Satmar) lived in Irshava twice, between 1911-1914, and again between 1922-1925. He established a yeshiva there. 

A local newspaper is published here since October 1946.

City since September 1982. In January 1989 the population was 9873 people.

Demographics
In 2001, population was 10,515. It included:
Ukrainians (98.6%)
Russians (0.7%)
Slovaks (0.3%)
Hungarians (0.3%)

Native language in 2001:
Ukrainian (97.9%)
Russian (1.4%)
Hungarian (0.4%)

Natives 
 Ivanna Bagová (born 1993) – Slovak singer, winner of The Voice of Czecho-Slovakia
 Rabbi Gruenberger Yaacov - active in Prague's Jewish Town  Alt-neu Schul synagogue; Studied in yeshiva in Trnava, Slovakia

Gallery

See also
Zakarpattia Oblast

References

External links
Irshava in the Encyclopedia of Ukraine
Wikimapia Maps

Cities in Zakarpattia Oblast
Cities of district significance in Ukraine